Tony McManus (born 1965) is a guitarist from Paisley, Scotland who plays finger-style acoustic guitar arrangements of tunes from Celtic music, classical music, and other genres. McManus emigrated from Scotland to Canada in 2003.

Music career
In 1988, McManus substituted for guitarist Soig Siberil in the supergroup Celtic Fiddle Festival, which consisted of  fiddlers Johnny Cunningham, Kevin Burke, and Christian Lemaitre. He has worked as accompanist for Catriona MacDonald and for singer, guitarist, and fiddler Brian McNeill. McManus's album Return to Kintail was a duet with Scottish fiddler Alasdair Fraser.

In addition to traditional Celtic music, McManus plays classical music and other genres. He performed a piece by Erik Satie for the soundtrack of a movie by Neil Jordan. Mandolinist Mike Marshall prodded him to learn Bach's E Major Prelude. He performed a chaconne by J.S. Bach at the Metropolitan Museum of Art in New York City with jazz fusion guitarist John McLaughlin.

He released his first album, Tony McManus, in 1996 on Greentrax Recordings. He recorded his second album, Pourquoi Quebec?, in Quebec, Canada and released it on the same label in 1998. His third album, Ceol More, was released in 2002  and achieved widespread critical acclaim.

Christina Roden wrote on AllMusic: "As usual, his command of acoustic guitar technique is flawless, with a chesty, rounded, gorgeous tone and a knack for well-marked rhythms and singing phrases." Gordon Potter wrote in Living Tradition, "Here is a musician demonstrating talent by making it seem understated. This is good, this is very good indeed, and there's not much else that can be said."

The album includes a version of Charles Mingus's Goodbye Porkpie Hat. He  recorded an album with bassist Alain Genty, titled Singing Sands.

In 2017, McManus was named one of "50 Transcendent Acoustic Guitarists" in Guitar Player magazine.

Signature model
In 2011, PRS Guitars created a McManus signature model guitar, a distinction he shares with jazz guitarist Al Di Meola, folk guitarist Martin Simpson—and rock guitarists Carlos Santana, John Mayer, Mark Lettieri, Ted Nugent, and Orianthi Panagaris. The custom model, designed by Paul Reed Smith, went into development after McManus visited bluegrass musician Ricky Skaggs in Nashville, Tennessee while on tour in America.

Discography
 Tony McManus (Greentrax, 1996)
 Pourquoi Quebec? (Greentrax, 1998)
 Return to Kintail  with Alasdair Fraser (Culburnie, 1999) 
 Ceol More (Compass, 2002)
 Singing Sands with Alain Gentry (Compass, 2005)
 The Maker's Mark (Compass, 2008)
 Mysterious Boundaries (Compass, 2013)
 Round Trip with Beppe Gambetta (Borealis, 2015)
 Live In Concert with Julia Toaspern (Greentrax, 2019)

As sideman/guest
 1995 Stage by Stage, Iain MacKintosh/Brian McNeill 
 1995 This Feeling Inside, Mairi MacInnes 
 1996 Are You Willing?, Tabache 
 1996 Inchcolm, William Jackson 
 1996 No Gods, Brian McNeill
 1996 Rod Paterson Sings Burns, Rod Paterson
 1996 Scenes of Scotland, Isla St Clair
 1997 Easter Snow: Irish Traditional Flute Music, Seamus Tansey 
 1998 Burns: Songs Vol. 4 
 1998 Celtic Experience, William Jackson 
 1998 Heepirumbo, Eilidh Shaw 
 1998 Hourglass, Kate Rusby 
 1998 Robert Burns: The Complete Songs, Vol. 5
 1999 Celtic Moods Gardyne Chamber Ensemble
 1999 Last Orders, Liz Doherty 
 1999 Spirit of Ireland, Gardyne Chamber Ensemble Guitar
 1999 Spirit of Scotland, Gardyne Chamber Ensemble Guitar
 2000 Alloway Tales, Ian Bruce
 2000 Auld Lang Syne: A Fine Selection of Popular Robert Burns Songs 
 2000 Bold, Catriona MacDonald
 2000 Connected, Gibb Todd 
 2000 Fine Flowers & Foolish Glances, Mick West 
 2000 Green Yarrow, Aileen Carr
 2000 Northern Lights Live from the Lemon Tree
 2000 Robert Burns: The Complete Songs, Vol. 8 
 2000 Shore Street, Billy Ross
 2000 Tryst, Iain MacInnes
 2001 Notes from a Hebridean Island, William Jackson
 2001 Orosay, Mairi MacInnes
 2001 The Islay Ball, Gary West
 2004 Live: The Art of the Steel String Guitar, Men of Steel
 2005 Live in Genova [DVD], Beppe Gambetta
 2006 Reunion, Daniel Lapp
 2007 Rosewood Castle, Robin Bullock 
 2009 Hymns and Hers, Oliver Schroer
 2009 Robert Burns: The Complete Songs, Vol. 4
 2009 Without Words, Doug Cox 
 2010 The Wind That Shakes the Barley, Loreena McKennitt
 2011 Live at the Teatro della Corte: The First 10 Years, Beppe Gambetta
 2013 Everything is Moving, Laura Smith
2017  Clyde's Water, Fiona Ross

References

External links 
 Tomy McManus official website
 "Tony McManus: Reinventing the Guitar" Rambles, October 2004

1965 births
Living people
Scottish male guitarists
Fingerstyle guitarists
Scottish emigrants to Canada
Musicians from Paisley, Renfrewshire
Canadian Folk Music Award winners
Canadian folk guitarists